Rudolph J. Nunnemacher (February 26, 1872 – January 29, 1900) worked in the real estate department of the Pabst Brewing Company.

He willed his collections to the Milwaukee Public Museum, encompassing nearly 2,000 items, including housewares and paintings from all over the world. The "Rudolph J. Nunnemacher Collection of Projectile Arms" and "The Nunnemacher Decorative Arts Collection" have since expanded through donations.

On June 22, 1897, Nunnemacher married Emma Pabst the daughter of  Captain Frederick Pabst.

References

1872 births
1900 deaths
Businesspeople from Milwaukee
19th-century American businesspeople